The Republic of Kosova or First Republic of Kosovo was a self-declared proto-state in Southeastern Europe established in 1991. During its peak, it tried to establish its own parallel political institutions in opposition to the institutions of the Autonomous Province of Kosovo and Metohija held by Yugoslavia's Republic of Serbia.

The flag used by the Republic of Kosova was very similar to the flag of Albania, depicting the same symbol on the same coloured background.

History

Proclamation
Late in June 1990, Albanian members of the provincial assembly proposed a vote on whether to form an independent republic; the ethnic Serb president of the assembly immediately shut it down and promised to reopen the assembly on 2 July, which was later postponed.

On 2 July, the vast majority of Albanian members of the Provincial Assembly returned to the Assembly, but it had been locked; so in the street outside they voted to declare Kosovo a Republic within the Yugoslav federation. The Serbian government responded by dissolving the Assembly and the government of Kosovo, removing any remaining autonomy. The Serb government then passed another law on labour relations which dismissed another 80,000 Albanian workers.

Ethnic Albanian members of the now officially dissolved Kosovo Assembly met in secret in Kaçanik on 7 September and declared the "Republic of Kosova" in which laws from Yugoslavia would only be valid if compatible with the Republic's constitution. The assembly went on to declare the "Republic of Kosova" an independent state on 22 September 1991. This declaration was endorsed by 99% of voters in an unofficial referendum held a few days later. The Republic of Kosova received diplomatic recognition from Albania.

Parallel structures
Kosovo Albanians organized a resistance movement, creating a number of parallel structures in education, medical care, and taxation. New schools opened, with houses being turned into facilities for schools, including high schools and universities. And on parallel elections, new leaders were elected, forming a new country within a country. Because of the repression, the new government had its seat in exile. There was a parallel football league, following all the sports men and women being expelled from the stadiums and sports facilities.

NATO intervention

From 1995 onwards, tensions in the region escalated leading to the Kosovo War which began in February 1998, fought between the Federal Republic of Yugoslavia and the Kosovo Liberation Army (KLA) guerrilla force. The KLA-led campaign continued into January 1999 and was brought to the attention of the world media by the Račak massacre, the mass killing of about 45 Albanians (Including 9 KLA insurgents) by Serbian security forces. An international conference was held in Rambouillet, France later that spring and resulted in a proposed peace agreement (the Rambouillet Agreement) which was accepted by the ethnic Albanian side but rejected by the Yugoslav government.

The failure of the talks at Rambouillet resulted in a NATO air campaign against the Federal Republic of Yugoslavia lasting from 24 March to 11 June when the Yugoslav authorities signed a military technical agreement allowing NATO peacekeepers (KFOR) and an international civilian mission (UNMIK) to enter Kosovo.

UNMIK assumed control of Kosovo. Provisional Institutions of Self-Government were established to allow Kosovo political and community leaders to be represented in decisions. The KLA was disbanded and replaced by the Kosovo Protection Corps, a lightly armed civilian emergency response organization.

Government

See also
Armed Forces of the Republic of Kosovo
Kosovo Liberation Army

Notes

References

Sources

Books 

 

History of Kosovo

1990 establishments in Kosovo
1999 disestablishments in Kosovo